KNCU (92.7 FM, "U92") is a radio station licensed to serve Newport, Oregon, United States.  The station is owned by Yaquina Bay Communications and the broadcast license is held by Pacific West Broadcasting, Inc.

History
This station received its original construction permit from the Federal Communications Commission on April 16, 1998.  The new station was assigned the KBGX call sign by the FCC on July 17, 1998.  KBGX received its license to cover from the FCC on May 30, 2000.  The station applied for new call letters and was assigned KNCU by the FCC on August 30, 2000.

In October 2000, Yaquina Bay Communications, Inc., reached an agreement to sell this station to Pacific West Broadcasting, Inc.  The deal was approved by the FCC on October 27, 2000, and the transaction was consummated on November 15, 2000.

Programming
KNCU broadcasts a country music format with some programming provided by Westwood One.  Syndicated music programming on KNCU includes America's Grand Ole Opry Weekend from Westwood One.

References

External links
KNCU official website
Yaquina Bay Communications

NCU
Country radio stations in the United States
Radio stations established in 2000
Lincoln County, Oregon
2000 establishments in Oregon